Kate O'Brien may refer to:
 Kate O'Brien (novelist) (1897–1974), Irish novelist and playwright
 Kate O'Brien (cyclist) (born 1988), Canadian track cyclist and bobsledder
 Kate Cruise O'Brien (1948–1998), Irish writer
 Kate O'Brien (The Drew Carey Show), a character from The Drew Carey Show

See also
Catherine O'Brien (disambiguation)
 Cathy O'Brien (disambiguation)
 Kate O'Brian, founder of O'Media Strategies
 Katie O'Brien (born 1986), British professional tennis player
 Katy O'Brien (Fair City character), from the Irish television series Fair City